Aplectrum hyemale is a species of orchid native to the eastern United States and Canada, from Oklahoma east to the Carolinas and north to Minnesota, Ontario, Quebec and Massachusetts. It is particularly common in the Appalachian Mountains, the Great Lakes Region, and the Ohio and Upper Mississippi Valleys. Isolated populations are also reported from Arizona.

Aplectrum hyemale is the sole species of the genus Aplectrum. The generic name comes from Greek and signifies "spurless". The species is commonly referred to as Adam and Eve or putty root; the latter refers to the mucilaginous fluid which can be removed from the tubers when they are crushed.

Aplectrum hyemale spreads underground through the growth of its tubers, forming large colonies. The leaves appear in late November and persist until March.  They are uniquely pin-striped, with parallel alternating silvery-white and green stripes. In late May or early June the flower stalk emerges carrying several flowers, each only a few millimeters across. It is sometimes confused with Tipularia discolor, another orchid species that occurs in eastern North America.

There exists a color variation, Aplectrum hyemale var. pallidum which differs in flower color.

References

External links

Plants For a Future
Lady Bird Johnson Wildflower Center, University of Texas
 
North Carolina Native Plant Society
Wisconsin State Department of Natural Resources
North Carolina Wildflowers, Shrubs and Trees by Jeff Pippen

Monotypic Epidendroideae genera
Calypsoinae genera
Orchids of Canada
Orchids of the United States
Calypsoinae
Taxa named by Gotthilf Heinrich Ernst Muhlenberg